The Aurora Inn was built in 1833 at Aurora, Cayuga County, New York, for Edwin B. Morgan, a local businessman involved in trade and shipping on Cayuga Lake, one of the seven Finger Lakes.  Aurora served as a port for shipping goods up the lake and through the Erie Canal to New York City and other major markets. Originally named Aurora House, the Aurora Inn was set on the shores of Cayuga Lake.

It is a contributing property in the Aurora Village-Wells College Historic District, listed on November 19, 1980, on the National Register of Historic Places.

History of the Aurora Inn 

E.B. Morgan was operator of the Morgan Store with his brothers. He made his wealth with trade and shipping from Aurora on Cayuga Lake and the Erie Canal. It was a busy port in the mid-19th century and local entrepreneurs created national businesses. Morgan was an early investor in The New York Times and American Express, the latter founded by his good friend Henry Wells. He served as a director on Wells' express mail and banking company, Wells Fargo & Company, founded to serve California.  Morgan's former home, the E. B. Morgan House, a lakefront mansion designed by New York City architect Joseph C. Davis, which is also in the historic district, has recently been renovated as a luxury bed and breakfast.

During the 19th century's busy years, the Aurora Inn was a favored overnight destination for travelers borne by stagecoach, canal boat and rail.  Soon after the Aurora Inn's opening, an article in the local newspaper noted the Inn's "regularity, neatness and order exhibited everywhere — as well as the thousand little attentions which are paid to the comfort and convenience of travelers". The writer also admired the Aurora Inn's "uninterrupted view of the water scenery of the most enchanting kind" and its "elegance scarcely surpassed by the most extensive houses of our large towns."

When a fire destroyed the main building at Wells College in 1888, many students lived temporarily at the Aurora Inn. They renamed it the Wayside Inn.

Fire struck again in the early hours of February 27. 1919, destroying Aurora's tiny business district between the old post office and the Aurora Inn. When the south cornices of the Inn caught fire, Wells College President Kerr Duncan McMillan climbed onto the roof and doused the fire with buckets of water handed to him by the village brigade. Today charred beams remain under the roof as a reminder of the Aurora Inn's narrow escape.

Since the early 20th century, the inn was a popular spot for students and families from Wells College, Cornell University, and other nearby colleges. In 1943, the Aurora Inn was deeded to Wells College. In the 1960s, when enrollment increased rapidly, the Inn served as a makeshift residence hall.

Because of regional economic issues and travel patterns, the Aurora Inn struggled financially starting in the 1970s. A drain on the college's resources, the Inn had to be closed several times during the last three decades, most recently in October 2000.

Aurora Inn today 

The Aurora Foundation, a partnership between Wells College and the Pleasant Rowland Foundation, renovated the Aurora Inn in 2001 to redevelop it for lodging, dining, and special events. Finished in 2003, the Aurora Inn had 10 guest rooms, a new restaurant with lakeside veranda dining, and a banquet room for special occasions. A stone terrace, lawns, and gardens were created to link the inn to the shores of Cayuga Lake.

The Aurora Inn renovation team included Pleasant Rowland, Katie Waller (Director of Aurora Foundation) and Steve McGlynn (Project Manager), Holt Architects of Ithaca, McGlynn Interiors of Skaneateles and Northeast Construction Services of Syracuse. The original fireplaces, woodwork and other architectural details were reused whenever possible. When they could not be reused, they were reproduced.  Historic photographs and etchings guided the exterior changes. The interior was remodeled to meet current code requirements and accommodate contemporary traveler needs.

The Aurora Inn's public rooms are decorated with antiques, Oriental rugs, and other furnishings. Its public spaces also feature a collection of historic and contemporary art. The Aurora Inn restaurant serves breakfast, lunch and dinner daily. A porch and tree-shaded veranda allow outdoor dining during warmer months.

In the early 1840s, Willem D. Eagles purchased the Aurora Inn. He engaged his uncle John Eagles, a retired sea captain, to manage it.  Oil portraits of William Eagles and his wife Nancy now hang above the fireplaces in the reception area and parlor. Portraits of John Eagles and his wife hang above fireplaces in the dining room and bar. These newly restored portraits were painted in the 19th century by New York artist Charles Loring Elliott.

See also
 List of threatened historic sites in the United States
 National Heritage Area
 Contributing property
 Cultural landscape
 Historic preservation

Sources

References

External links

"Local Attractions", Wells College Newsletter
Website for the Aurora Inn at the Inns of Aurora 

Hotel buildings on the National Register of Historic Places in New York (state)
Hotel buildings completed in 1833
1833 establishments in New York (state)
Bed and breakfasts in New York (state)
Buildings and structures in Cayuga County, New York
Tourist attractions in Cayuga County, New York
National Register of Historic Places in Cayuga County, New York
Historic district contributing properties in New York (state)